GrailQuest is a series of gamebooks by J. H. Brennan. The books are illustrated by John Higgins. The stories follow the adventures of a young hero named Pip, who is often called upon by Merlin to right wrongs and save the realm from evil. The series is light in tone and does not take itself seriously, often spoofing the fantasy genre and inserting slapstick humour or nonsensical elements.

The series is mostly set in King Arthur's realm of Avalon, although the fourth volume, Voyage of Terror, takes place almost entirely in ancient Greece, after Merlin's summoning spell goes wrong.

While there were eight total books published in the series, books seven and eight were never published in the United States.

Characters 

Pip: The hero of the series. Pip was brought up on a farm as the adopted child of Freeman John and his wife Miriam. One day, soldiers from King Arthur's court arrived to escort Pip to Merlin's log castle, where Merlin assigned the young adventurer the mission of rescuing Queen Guinevere from the evil Wizard Ansalom. Pip fights (and sometimes argues) with a speaking magical sword, Excalibur Junior, and often wears a sturdy dragonhide jacket when adventuring.  Pip is never assigned a gender pronoun by anyone in the books and as such could be a female hero, though the assumption is usually taken that Pip is a young boy. Pip does declare himself lord of the jungle at one point, and EJ, referring to Pip, says "unhand him, varlet!".
Merlin: The (supposedly) wise old wizard. He introduces each adventure and is usually the one who gives Pip his mission, providing Pip with items and some magic. Merlin tends to be sarcastic and grumpy, not to mention eccentric. However, even though he treats Pip like a foolish child, he still cares about the young adventurer. In one of the series' running jokes, Merlin acquires a new, bizarre home in every volume.
Cody: Merlin's young apprentice, introduced in Legion of the Dead, who brings Pip to Avalon via the Net Spell after Merlin disappears and is presumed dead following a fall from a tree.
Excalibur Junior (E.J.): Pip's magical talking sword. It was created by Merlin, who based its design on King Arthur's sword (hence the "Junior"). E.J. is quite powerful but has the annoying tendency of speaking its mind at inconvenient times, and can even refuse to be pulled from its scabbard (showing an ability similar to its namesake) when in a bad mood. E.J. also suffers from arachnophobia, which is a disadvantage when Pip runs into giant spiders.
The Poetic Fiend: A vampire poet who is a recurring character through the series. The Fiend believes that he is a great poet, when in actuality his verse tends more towards doggerel (and has been known to make even cockroaches throw up when he gives a recital). He is often helpful to Pip, as long as Pip is diplomatic in his criticism of the Fiend's poetry. In the English-language books, the Fiend is unnamed. In the French translations, however, he is known as Nosferax.
King Arthur: Ruler of the realm of Avalon. He is rarely encountered by the player in person, but is a prominent and influential figure in the series. He is usually the one who gives missions to Pip by the way of Merlin.
King Pellinore: King Pellinore of Listinoise appears in the first few books as a running gag, where he is often confused for the Black Knight because of his dark armour. Often it is Pellinore who is assigned the task of taking care of whatever problem is plaguing Camelot, with Pip only coming in later after the poor old king gets himself hopelessly lost.
The Wizard Ansalom: An evil black-magic-using wizard, who is the main villain in the very first adventure. He returns as a ghost when Pip visits the Ghastly Kingdom of the Dead and Pip discovers that some of his dark influence remains in the last volume.
The Black Knight: The Black Knight of old legend is the main villain in one of Pip's adventures. He seems to appear in several volumes, but those other appearances are actually King Pellinore (see above).

Titles 

 The Castle of Darkness (1984)
 The Den of Dragons (1984) 
 The Gateway of Doom (1984) 
 Voyage of Terror (1985) 
 Kingdom of Horror (1985) 
 Realm of Chaos (1986) 
 Tomb of Nightmares (1986) 
 Legion of the Dead (1987)

Combat 

The rules of GrailQuest are quite simple when compared to current RPGs. The player must roll two six-sided dice and add the results. If the result exceeds 6 (which will happen 58.3% of the time), then the enemy is injured and loses a number of Life Points - how much depends on what the dice shows, as every point over 6 will count as a point of damage. When a character's Life Points reach zero, the character is dead, and when they are at 5, they are knocked out.

If wielding a weapon, the number needed to hit may be lower, and extra damage will usually be inflicted. For instance, Excalibur Junior hits on a roll of 4 (hitting 91.7% of the time) and provides a bonus 5 points of damage.

There is no defence roll, but damage is reduced by a set amount by any armour the character is wearing.

Initiative is determined by an initial, opposed roll where the highest roll gets the first attack. From then on, the character and the enemy take turns to attack. Surprise is sometimes involved (for example, in Gateway of Doom, a giant spider gets first strike automatically due to Pip being in its home territory).

If the character dies, the player must go to section 14, which describes his afterdeath and tells him to calculate his Life Points again. Merlin then resurrects Pip, who has to start from the beginning of the adventure again - although some books will only require him to start from a certain point; for example, Gateway of Doom allows Pip to restart at the beginning of the Ghastly Kingdom of the Dead, and Realm of Chaos allows him to start from the beginning of a certain location. However, all previously killed enemies remain dead, and any treasure the player found is gone for good. (In some books, killed enemies return to life with half the Life Points they had the first time around.)

Magic spells 

In some of the books, Merlin provides Pip with magic spells. In the first book, Pip has only two spells - ten firefingers (lightning bolts) and two powerful fireballs. The firefinger lightning bolts hit automatically for a straight 10 points of damage, while the fireballs score a massive 75 points of damage each, but require a 6 or better on two dice or else they miss completely.

Pip's First Spell Book 

In the second book, Merlin provides Pip with a spell book. This provides Pip with more spells of various uses in and out of combat. Pip also receives ten new firefingers (different from the firefingers on the previous book) and two new fireballs. If the player has finished the first book, he can keep any unspent spells from the previous book, and also the dragonhide jacket, which would otherwise be unavailable.

Pip's use of magic is limited by three rules that must be adhered to at all times. First, every spell thrown costs three Life Points whether it is cast successfully or not. Second, no spell can be thrown more than three times in any given adventure (and once thrown, it is used whether or not it is successfully cast). And third, no spell thrown is successfully cast unless a 7 or better is rolled on two dice.

Pip's Armour of Nearly Impenetrable Coruscation (P.A.N.I.C. for short) - Throws a shimmering wall of light around the caster for the duration of a single combat, which deducts four points of damage scored against Pip in addition to any other protection or armour worn.
Pip's Outlandish Wallop (P.O.W. for short) - Adds +10 damage to the next attack Pip makes on top of any other attack bonuses.
Pip's Instant Levity and Laughter (P.I.L.L. for short) - Causes a single enemy to laugh so hard and misses the next three consecutive turns in combat.
Pip's Attacking Dart (P.A.D. for short) - Allows Pip to launch a ranged attack for a straight 10 damage against an opponent who is otherwise out of combat range. An enemy hit with the dart can only counter-attack with ranged weaponry or spells.
Pip's Immunity to Poison (P.I.P. for short) - If cast before poison is taken, it completely counteracts the effects of the poison. The spell does not function if cast after Pip has already been poisoned, however.
Pip's Instant Neutralizer (P.I.N. for short) - Counteracts one spell or enchantment placed on an object (not a living being). It is useful for opening a chest or door which has been magically locked, for example.
Pip's Immense Rapid Repeater (Pi R squared for short) - Doubles Pip's speed during a single combat, allowing Pip to get in two attacks for every one made by an opponent.
Invisibility (I.N.V.I.S.I.B.I.L.I.T.Y. for short) - This spell is an exception to the normal rules of magic in that it can only be cast once per adventure for a cost of 15 Life Points, and only in designated areas, but the effect renders Pip completely invisible.
Firefinger - This spell is an exception to the normal rules of magic in that it can only be successfully cast once per adventure. It gives Pip 10 Firefinger lightning bolts (five in each hand) which can be fired immediately or stored for later use.
Fireball - Like the Firefinger spell, it can only be successfully cast once per adventure. It gives Pip 2 fireballs which can be thrown immediately or stored for later use.

Pip's Second Spell Book 

In the third book, Merlin provides Pip with a new spell book. When Pip wonders why this second spell book is shorter than the first one, Merlin tells Pip that spell books require a great deal of research and development, making them quite expensive, and he is not made of money. These spells follow the same three rules of magic described in the second book.

Pip's Patent Lock Picker (P.L.O.P. for short) - Will pick one non-magic lock per section on a throw of 6 or better on two dice.
Pip's Incredible Duncher (P.I.D. for short) - Creates a magical cap which, when worn, shrinks Pip to the size of six inches, thus allowing travel through small passageways. Pip returns to normal size in the next section.
Pip's Amazing Legume Spell (P.A.L.S. for short) - If Pip should come under attack by any sort of vegetable, this spell guarantees an automatic Friendly Reaction from said vegetable.
Pip's Instant Levitation (P.I.L. for short) - Allows Pip to levitate straight up or down, but if used indoors it causes a concussion when you hit the ceiling and the loss of half your current Life Points.
Pip's Obliging Power Sword (P.O.P.S. for short) - If cast before a hit roll in combat, it causes E.J. to score double damage on the next strike, but only half damage on the hit after that.

Spell books, Firefingers, Fireballs, the dragonhide jacket and even E.J. are not available in the fourth book. Both spell books are also unavailable in books five and six; in the former case because Merlin has run out of time, and in the latter because no magic will work on account of the curse on Camelot.

Running Jokes 

In every book, once you are killed you have to turn to the infamous section 14. This rule is true for all of J.H. Brennan's gamebooks, except the Demonspawn series where the killed player must go to the section 13.
Merlin's eccentricities are showcased in each book with Merlin acquiring a new dwelling, more bizarre and off-the-wall than the last. In Castle of Darkness, Merlin lives in a log castle. He's moved to a crystal cave in Den of Dragons.  By Gateway of Doom, he has moved into the lightning-blasted remains of an ancient druid oak. Voyage of Terror shows Merlin trying out a magical bubble spell which places a home of sorts at the bottom of the well in the town square of Glastonbury Village. In Kingdom of Horror he has created a home in the shape of a large six-sided die up in the Welsh Mountains. Realm of Chaos actually showcases two of Merlin's homes: the first being the enormous barrel-shaped house he is living in at the beginning, and the second one being a sort of abandoned fortress in the Astral Plane. Tomb of Nightmares has Merlin living inside a hollowed-out roc egg, presented to King Arthur by a drunken Arab sailor and given to the wizard when the King had no other idea of what to do with it. Only the final book in the series omits specific details about Merlin's home, though wherever it stands, there is a one-way door out of it which leads into Hell.
In Realm of Chaos, Pip finds a book "about some idiot called Fire*Wolf", who is the hero of Demonspawn, another series by J.H. Brennan.
Upon meeting Pip, most people recognize him as "...the one that put paid to old Ansalom, eh?"  Ansalom, as previously noted, was the villain in the first book. In addition, the further along in the series one gets, the more titles get appended to Pip's name. By the end of the series, Pip is known as the Wizard Basher, Dragon Slayer, Gateway Closer, Realm Saver, and Chaos Tamer and is often addressed by all of those titles at once by Merlin or E.J. and often at times when brevity would be far better for the circumstances.

Reception
In the inaugural issue of The Games Machine, John Woods thought the books had a "pleasant light-hearted feel." He also noted that Grailquest books required a lot of skill, as opposed to the large element of random chance required in the rival Fighting Fantasy book series. Woods thought that Grailquest should have done as well or even better than Fighting Fantasy, but speculated that  perhaps players "preferred the hectic hack-and-slay action of Fighting Fantasy to the more leisurely and lengthy descriptive sections of Grailquest."

Electronic versions

In 2012 the company Tin Man Games planned to create iOS and Android versions of the books.

References

External links 

J H Brennan Book Covers & Info
J H "Herbie" Brennan's personal website 
Demians' Gamebook Web Page Guide to GrailQuest gamebooks.
Realm of Chaos at the Internet Archive

1984 books
1985 books
1986 books
1987 books
Games based on Arthurian legend
Modern Arthurian fiction
Fantasy gamebooks
Gamebooks
Series of children's books